Pook is a surname, and may refer to:

 David Pook (born 1955), English former professional footballer
 Edmund Walter Pook (born 1851), Englishman accused of the Eltham Murder
 Jocelyn Pook (born 1960), English composer and viola player
 John Pook (born 1942), Welsh poet
 Michael Pook (born 1986), English footballer
 Peter Pook (1918-1978), British author
 Robert Pook (born 1967), English cricketer
 Samuel Moore Pook (1804–1878), American naval architect (father of Samuel H. Pook)
 Samuel Hartt Pook (1827–1901), American naval architect (son of Samuel M. Pook)
 Tom Pook (1869–1948), Wales international rugby player

See also
Pook (disambiguation)